Bull wrestling, cow fighting or bull fighting is a non-lethal bloodsport between bulls or cows found in some parts of the world.

Balkans

Korida, from corrida, or borbe bikova ("fights of bulls") is a traditional sport in Bosnia and Herzegovina and Croatia.

Bosnia and Herzegovina
Grmeč, a mountain in the extreme west of Bosnia, is the best-known site of bullfights in the Balkans. They are called the Korida of Grmeč (Grmečka korida) and have been organised on every first Sunday in August for over 200 years, attracting thousands of visitors. These are fights between bulls themselves and there is no death of a bull. Fights happen in an empty field.

The korida of Grmeč was depicted by the sculptor Slobodan Pejić. The sculpture of two bulls in a fight, made in bronze in 2004, has been compared to a confrontation of the oppressor and the oppressed or of the Bosnian people and the Austrian Emperor.

Croatia
In Croatia, koridas are traditionally organized in Dalmatian Hinterland region.

Turkey
Bull wrestling in Turkey is known as boğa güreşi (literally "bull wrestling"). Each year in the third week of June, the Kafkasör (Caucasus) festival takes place in the city of Artvin. At the beginning of the festival, certain rules are applied in order to save the bulls from injury. For example, if a bull retreats from the fight, it means defeat, etc.

East and Southeast Asia

Tōgyū, or "Okinawan bullfighting", is the traditional sport of the Ryukyu Islands, in which two bulls attempt, as in sumo wrestling, to push one another out of a ring.
Sossaum is a traditional sport of Korea, in which two oxen are pitted against each other.
Bullfighting is also observed by the ethnic Hmong/Miao minority in China, Vietnam and Laos. Bulls are selected by age, horn length and size. They are enticed to fight usually after new year's or summer events. They are usually non-lethal events and bulls that carry the opposing bulls will get the most points if it is a draw. The loser is usually the bull that flees first even if winning.

Western Asia
 
In Oman and the United Arab Emirates two Brahman bulls are presented to each other and allowed to lock horns and fight, while their handlers hold ropes to separate them if necessary. The origins of bullfighting in Oman are unknown, though locals believe it was brought here by the Moors who had conquered Spain. Its existence in Oman and the UAE is also attributed to Portugal, which colonized the Omani coastline for nearly two centuries, and also introduced bullfighting to Omani Zanzibar.

South Asia

India
Dhiri or Dhirio (Konkani: धिरी,धिरयो) is a popular form of traditional bull wrestling in the state of Goa, Coastal South West India. It was the weekend entertainment staple for most villages. Many families lived off the earnings made on appearance money and bets alone. The Panaji Bench of the high Court vide order dated 20.12.96 directed the State Government to take immediate steps to ban all types of animal fights including Dhiri organised in the State of Goa, which was finally banned in 1997. Dhiri bullfights are still very popular in Goa despite the ban. There have been demands for legalizing Dhiri.

Nepal
Every year on the day of Maghe Sankranti in different districts of Nepal bull wrestling is organized. The most oldest and popular bull wrestling of Nepal is of Taruka, Nuwakot, 75 km away from Country's capital. It is believed to be started more than 200 years ago as source of entertainment. Many people from around the country visit Taruka to witness this event. Other than Nuwakot bull wrestling is also organized in Dhading and Rasuwa.

Kenya 

The Luhya community in Kenya practices a bull-on-bull sport.

Views of the Muslim World League
On 17 October 1987, the Muslim World League issued a fatwa declaring bullfighting and animal pits to be forbidden under Islamic law.

Gallery

See also
Bull-baiting
Bullfighting
Camel wrestling
Alligator wrestling
Cockfight
Combat de Reines, cow wrestling in Switzerland
Dog fighting
Horn fighting, the way horned ungulates fight

References

External links

Baiting (blood sport)
Bull sports
Animals in sport
Animal combat sports
Animal festival or ritual
Sports festivals
Wrestling
Animal combat organized by humans